"Waiting for an Alibi" is a song by Irish rock band Thin Lizzy, and the first single from their 1979 album, Black Rose: A Rock Legend. Black Rose was the only Thin Lizzy album recorded while Gary Moore was a member of the band, and he left soon after. 

The song was released as a single reaching No. 9 in the UK Singles Chart and No. 6 in Ireland, and an accompanying video was filmed. The band promoted the single with a performance on The Kenny Everett Video Show,

An extended version of this track can be found on The Adventures of Thin Lizzy compilation LP released in 1981, Dedication: The Very Best of Thin Lizzy released on CD in 1991, as well as Wild One: The Very Best of Thin Lizzy, released in 1996. It also appears on the compilation albums Lizzy Killers (1981) and Soldier of Fortune (1987). This version lasts 4:08 and has a third verse and chorus not included on the single.

History
Prior to its release, the track had been reworked from its original recording. A demo of the song was recorded in early 1978 and featured Brian Robertson on lead guitar alongside Scott Gorham (this was prior to Gary Moore's return to the band). The song was also played at Thin Lizzy's major gig at Sydney Harbour in late 1978 where the version performed could be described lyrically as a cross-over between the original demo and the final version that was released the following year.

When Moore left Thin Lizzy in July 1979, Midge Ure was brought in to help finish a tour of the US, becoming the first in a string of guitarists to perform the song with the band. He was followed by Dave Flett, Snowy White and John Sykes before Thin Lizzy split in 1983. In later incarnations of the band, Vivian Campbell, Richard Fortus and Damon Johnson also performed Moore's parts.

Personnel (studio version)
Phil Lynott – bass guitar, lead vocals
Scott Gorham – lead guitar
Gary Moore – lead guitar
Brian Downey – drums

References

Thin Lizzy songs
1979 singles
Songs written by Phil Lynott
Song recordings produced by Tony Visconti
Vertigo Records singles
1979 songs